John Thornton may refer to:

Sports
 John Thornton (Australian cricketer) (1835–1919), Australian cricketer
 John Thornton (Leicestershire cricketer) (1902–1993), English cricketer
 John Thornton (baseball), American baseball pitcher
 John Thornton (American football) (born 1976), American football player
 John Thornton (athlete) (1911–1944), British Olympic hurdler

Government and politics
 John Thornton (MP), English MP for Kingston upon Hull (UK Parliament constituency)
 John Thornton (Canadian politician) (1823–1888), Canadian merchant and politician in Quebec
 John Thornton (American politician) (1846–1917), American Louisiana politician and senator

Fictional characters
 John Thornton, a leading character in Jack London's novel The Call of the Wild
 John Thornton (North and South), a leading character in Elizabeth Gaskell's novel North and South

Other
 John Thornton (bishop), English 16th-century bishop and university administrator
 John Thornton (glass painter), English York Minster stained glass designer between 1405 and 1408
 John Thornton (cartographer) (1641–1708), English cartographer and hydrographer; see Turtle Gut Inlet
 John Thornton (philanthropist) (1720–1790), merchant and Christian philanthropist
 John Thornton (philosopher), British author, computer scientist and phenomenologist
 John Thornton (historian) (born 1949), American historian
 John L. Thornton, former president and co-COO of Goldman Sachs
 John S. Thornton, bishop
 John P. Thornton, CEO of Astrobotic Technology Inc.
 John Wingate Thornton, American lawyer, historian, antiquarian, book collector and author

See also
 Jolly Jack's Lost Mine, a legend about a secret gold mine discovered by Canadian prospector Jack Thornton